Matthieu Cangni Dossevi (born 12 February 1988) is a professional footballer who plays as a winger. Born in France, he represented the Togo national team.

Career

Valenciennes
Dossevi joined Valenciennes from Le Mans in the summer of 2010 and played 110 times for them scoring eleven goals for Ligue 1. On 18 March 2014, Dossevi stated that he would leave Valenciennes at the end of the season.

Olympiacos
In July 2014, Dossevi signed for the Greek champions Olympiakos, for an undisclosed fee.

While former manager Michel had been reluctant to play him regularly, new manager Vítor Pereira used him twice in a row in the starting line-up and Dossevi proved his quality by scoring both against Skoda Xanthi and Panetolikos in the Super League Greece.

Standard Liège (loan)
On 1 September 2015, he signed a one-year contract with Standard Liège on loan from Olympiakos.

Standard Liège
In January 2016, Standard Liège exercised its option to sign Dossevi permanently until the summer of 2020, for a transfer fee of €1.3 million.

FC Metz (loan)
On 31 August 2017, he signed a season-long contract with Ligue 1 club FC Metz on loan from Standard Liège while Metz was given an option to purchase the player at the end of the season, and Metz definitively bought Dossevi on 30 May for a transfer fee of €3 million, even though they were relegated to French second tier.

Toulouse
On 3 August 2018, Dossevi signed for Toulouse on a two-year contract, having been the third best passer of the previous season behind Neymar and Florian Thauvin. The transfer fee paid to Standard Liège was reported as €2.5 million. He left the club upon the expiration of his contract and following Toulouse's relegation from Ligue 1 at the end of the 2019–20 season.

Amiens
On 31 August 2021, he joined Amiens on a one-season deal.

International career
The French-born player has featured for the French under-20 and U-21 national teams, but is now a member of the Togolese national team, for which he was called up to the 2015 Africa Cup of Nations qualifiers.

International goals

Scores and results list Togo's goal tally first, score column indicates score after each Dossevi goal.

Personal life
Dossevi and his brother Thomas, a Togolese international footballer, are the sons of Pierre-Antoine Dossevi, who played for Paris Saint-Germain in the 70s. His uncle Othniel, another former PSG footballer, is the father of pole vaulter Damiel Dossevi, who competes for France.

Honours
Olympiacos
Super League Greece:  2014–15
Greek Cup: 2014–15

Standard Liège
Belgian Cup: 2015–16

References

External links
 

1988 births
Living people
People from Chambray-lès-Tours
French sportspeople of Togolese descent
Citizens of Togo through descent
Togolese people of French descent
Sportspeople from Indre-et-Loire
Association football wingers
Togolese footballers
French footballers
France youth international footballers
France under-21 international footballers
Togo international footballers
2017 Africa Cup of Nations players
Le Mans FC players
Valenciennes FC players
Olympiacos F.C. players
Standard Liège players
FC Metz players
Toulouse FC players
Denizlispor footballers
Amiens SC players
Ligue 1 players
Süper Lig players
Super League Greece players
Belgian Pro League players
Ligue 2 players
Togolese expatriate footballers
Togolese expatriate sportspeople in Greece
Expatriate footballers in Greece
Togolese expatriate sportspeople in Belgium
Expatriate footballers in Belgium
Togolese expatriate sportspeople in Turkey
Expatriate footballers in Turkey
Dossevi family
Footballers from Centre-Val de Loire